No Grounds For Pity was a compilation album of early demo material (including a 1986 demo of the same name) by the New York hardcore band, Sheer Terror. The tracks were recorded between 1985 and 1988 and released in Europe on Blackout Records in 1996 – a year after the band made their first major label release, Love Songs For the Unloved, on MCA Records.

The album demonstrates the heavy metal influenced hardcore punk style of the band and the production is suitably raw – nearly every track initiates with a brief blast of feedback leading to heavily distorted guitar riffs.

Track listing
All songs written by Sheer Terror
1985 demo
1. "Obsoletion"			– 2:04
2. "Smile For a Price"		– 2:53
3. "Howard Unruh"		– 2:29
4. "Not Giving Up"		– 3:02
5. "Burning Time"		– 3:51
6. "Owe You Nothing"		– 2:31
7. "Into My Life"		– 4:31
8. "Fashion Fighter"		– 2:37
9. "Ready to Halt"		– 2:15
No Grounds For Pity demo	
10. "Owe You Nothing"		– 2:30
11. "Burning Time"		– 3:46
12. "Into My Life"		– 4:32
13. "Not Giving Up"		– 2:50
14. "Only 13"			– 2:01
15. "Obsoletion"		– 1:57
16. "Howard Unruh"		– 2:19
17. "Rome Song"  		– 1:45
Fall From Grace demo
18. "Ashes, Ashes"		– 2:29
19. "Walls"			– 2:33
20. "Ready to Halt"		– 2:20
21. "Only 13"			– 2:02
22. "Into My Life"		– 4:28
23. "Burning Time"		– 3:43
Live 1986
24. "Smile For a Price"		– 3:02
25. "Everything and Nothing"	– 1:51
1988 demo
26. "Twisting and Turning"	– 2:48

Credits
 Paul Bearer – vocals, all tracks
 Alan Blake – guitar, all tracks
 Baron "Barry" Misuraca – bass, tracks 1 – 17
 Mark Neuman – bass, tracks 18 – 26
 Sam "Reid" Lohman – drums, tracks 1 – 17
 Jason Martin – drums, tracks 18 – 26
 Recorded between 1985 – 1988 in New York City, USA
 Produced by Sheer Terror

Miscellanea
 The back cover contains a misprint in that it lists a 27th track, another version of "Burning Time" which does not actually appear on the album
 Howard Unruh is a World War II veteran who embarked on a killing spree in 1949

External links
Sheer Terror official website
Thorp Records band page
Blackout Records band page
JTTP Records band page

1996 compilation albums
Demo albums
Sheer Terror albums